Mark Bartholomeusz (born 30 June 1977) is a retired Australian professional rugby union footballer. He played in the positions of fullback, flyhalf, inside centre, and wing.

Career
Bartholomeusz attended Brisbane State High School.He played in the 1st XV from grade 10 in the same team as his older brother Greg. He was also a talented cricketer.  He played for the ACT Brumbies and was a member of the side that defeated the Sharks in 2001 and the Crusaders in 2004 to win Super 12 titles.

He joined Saracens where he played the 2004–05 and 2005–06 seasons in the English Premiership, followed by Irish Magners League club Ulster for 2006–07 and 2007–08. In 2008, Bartholomeusz signed with Padova to play in the Italian Super 10 (now Top12) for the 2008/09 season. He returned to Australia to play for the Western Force in 2010 and 2011.
Bartholomeusz holds a record for having the fourth-shortest international rugby union career. In 2002, he represented Australia for 2 minutes and 33 seconds against Italy. Nick Henderson (Australia), Sean McCahill (Ireland) and Mathieu Dourthe (France) are the only players to have shorter international careers.

Reference list

External links
 
Western Force Profile

1977 births
Australian rugby union players
Ulster Rugby players
Living people
Australia international rugby union players
Western Force players
ACT Brumbies players
Saracens F.C. players
People educated at Brisbane State High School
Expatriate rugby union players in England
Expatriate rugby union players in Italy
Expatriate rugby union players in Northern Ireland
Rugby union players from Brisbane
Male rugby sevens players
Sportsmen from Queensland
Australia international rugby sevens players
Australian expatriate rugby union players
Australian expatriate sportspeople in England
Australian expatriate sportspeople in Northern Ireland
Australian expatriate sportspeople in Italy